Reddal is a village in the municipality of Grimstad in Agder county, Norway. The main industry in the village is agriculture, with the most important products being potatoes, berries and grain. The large lake Syndle lies just north of the village.

The freshwater Reddalsvannet lake is located along the south side of the village area. There is a protected nature reserve at the lake. This lowered the water down to sea level. The Reddal Canal connects the Reddalsvannet lake and the nearby Landviksvannet lake to the sea. Today, the canal is popular with small boats.

References

Villages in Agder
Grimstad